Max Seeburg (19 September 1884 – 24 January 1972) was a German footballer who played in England for Chelsea, Tottenham Hotspur, Burnley, Grimsby Town and Reading between 1906 and 1912. Seeburg became the first European-born foreigner to play in England.

Biography
Born in Leipzig, Seeburg moved to London in 1886, at the age of two. His first professional club was Chelsea, who he joined in 1906. He did not play a competitive match for the West London side, and two years later moved across the city to join Tottenham Hotspur. Seeburg's first and only league match for Tottenham was on 26 September 1908, in a 1–0 away defeat to Hull City in the Second Division. He moved to Leyton in the following month.

After a season at Leyton, Seeburg left London and spent the 1910–11 season back in the Second Division with Burnley. After a spell at Grimsby Town later that year, he joined Reading, where he retired in 1912.

Seeburg died in Reading in 1972.

References

1884 births
1972 deaths
Footballers from Leipzig
People from the Kingdom of Saxony
German footballers
English Football League players
Chelsea F.C. players
Tottenham Hotspur F.C. players
Burnley F.C. players
Grimsby Town F.C. players
Reading F.C. players
Leyton F.C. players
Association football midfielders